The elk (Cervus canadensis) is a large antlered mammal within the deer family.

Elk may also refer to:

Wildlife 
 Eurasian elk or moose (Alces alces), the largest extant species in the deer family
 Irish elk (Megaloceros giganteus, extinct), one of the largest deer that ever lived
 Whooper swan or elk, a large Northern Hemisphere swan

Arts and entertainment
 Elk (.hack), a character in the .hack alternative history franchise
 Elk (album), 2005, by Inga Liljeström
 Elk (Milwaukee sculpture), a 1901 public artwork
 E L K, èlk or ELK, Australian hip hop artist on the Playback 808 label
 Thompson Elk Fountain, an outdoor fountain in Portland, Oregon, by Roland Hinton Perry

Places 
 Ełk, a town in northeastern Poland
 Elk, Fresno County, California
 Elk, Mendocino County, California
 Elk, Kansas
 Elk, Ohio
 Elk City, Oklahoma
 Elk, Washington
 Elk, West Virginia
 Elk, Wisconsin

Technology
 Extension Language Kit, an implementation of the Scheme programming language
 ELK stack, a technology stack composed of Elasticsearch, Logstash, and Kibana, now called Elastic Stack
 Acorn Electron, nicknamed "Elk", an 8-bit microcomputer produced in the 1980s by British company Acorn Computers

Transportation 
 Elk, a locomotive of the South Devon Railway Eagle class
 Elk (steam tug), formerly operated on Puget Sound
 Elk (sternwheeler 1857), a steamboat

Other uses
 Elk (surname)
 Elk Mountains (Colorado)
 Elk v. Wilkins, a United States Supreme Court case

See also
 Elk County (disambiguation)
 Elk Creek (disambiguation)
 Elk Lake (disambiguation)
 Elk Range (disambiguation)
 Elk River (disambiguation)
 Elk Township (disambiguation)
 Elko (disambiguation)
 Elks (disambiguation)